Michigan's 26th Senate district is one of 38 districts in the Michigan Senate. The 26th district was created by the 1850 Michigan Constitution, as the 1835 constitution only permitted a maximum of eight senate districts. It has been represented by Republican Kevin Daley since 2023, succeeding fellow Republican Aric Nesbitt.

Geography
District 26 encompasses parts of Genesee, Lapeer, Saginaw, and Tuscola counties.

2011 Apportionment Plan
District 26, as dictated by the 2011 Apportionment Plan, stretched along the Lake Michigan coast in Allegan and Van Buren Counties and parts of Kent County. Communities within the district included Kentwood, South Haven, Hartford, Paw Paw, Allegan, Otsego, Plainwell, Wayland, Antwerp Township, Gaines Township, and southern Holland.

The district was located largely within Michigan's 6th congressional district, also extending into the 2nd and 3rd districts. It overlapped with the 66th, 72nd, and 80th districts of the Michigan House of Representatives.

List of senators

Recent election results

2018

2014

Federal and statewide results in District 26

Historical district boundaries

References 

26
Allegan County, Michigan
Kent County, Michigan
Van Buren County, Michigan